Svetloye is a rural locality (a selo) in Ikryaninsky District, Astrakhan Oblast, Russia. The population was 254 as of 2010. There are 3 streets.

Geography 
Svetloye is located 27 km south of Ikryanoye (the district's administrative centre) by road. Ninovka is the nearest rural locality.

References 

Rural localities in Ikryaninsky District